Banashankari, abbreviated as BSK, is a locality in South Bangalore. It gets its name from the Banashankari Amma Temple on Kanakapura Road, one of Bangalore's oldest and well known temples constructed by Subramanya Shetty in 1915. 

Banashankari is the largest locality in Bangalore, extending all the way from Mysore Road to Kanakapura Road. It is bound by Girinagar and Rajarajeshwari Nagar in the west, Basavangudi in the north, Jayanagar and J.P. Nagar in the east, and Padmanabhanagar, Kumaraswamy Layout, ISRO Layout, Vasanthapura and Uttarahalli in the south.

Areas under Banashankari

Banashankari is the only locality which has all the possible classifications –  stage, phase and block. It is divided into six stages, with the sixth stage being the largest.

Banashankari 1st Stage
This area is one of the oldest areas of Bangalore. It subsumes areas such as Hanumanthanagar, Byatarayanapura, Srinagar, Nagendra Block, Kalidasa Layout, Raghavendra Block, Brindavan Nagar, Srinivasa Nagar, Vidyapeetha, SBM colony and Ashok Nagar.

This part of Banashankari is well-known for the Ramanjaneya Temple and Kumara Swamy Devasthana. PES Degree College is also located here.

Banashankari 2nd Stage
This area is close to Jayanagar. It is home to eminent persons such as Devegowda, Anil Kumble, P. C. Mohan and Ramesh Arvind. Well known theater artist Master Hirannaiah and popular detective novelist T. K. Rama Rao were residents of this locality.

It has two well-known hills - Banagiri, which houses the Varasiddhi Vinayaka Temple and Devagiri, which houses the Venkateshwara Temple. It is the main commercial area of Banashankari. It also subsumes areas like Kadirenahalli, Teachers Colony II Stage, Yarab Nagar, Karesandra and Kaveri Nagar.

Karesandra

Teachers Colony - 
This locality, developed mainly for school teachers, is a very well-developed locality and has the famous Narasimha Temple. Kadirenahalli Cross, which is a big junction adjoins Teachers Colony.

Yarab Nagar is a Muslim majority area.
At Yarabnagar, there is a mosque by name Masjid-E-Quba.

Kadirenahalli
Kadirenahalli was infamous for its long-delayed underpass which had hampered traffic in South Bangalore. The work started in 2008 and is now complete.

Banashankari 3rd Stage
A relatively new area, formed in the mid-1980s. It is divided into 3 phases and 9 blocks. It also subsumes areas like Muneshwara Block, Avalahalli, Srividya Nagar, Hosakerehalli, Veerabhadra Nagar, Kathriguppe, Bhuvaneshwari Nagar (Chikkalasandra), Kamakya layout, Kathriguppe, Vivekananda Nagar Janatha Bazar, Ittamadu, and Channammanakere Achukattu.

Hosakerehalli
An old village that was formerly under Rajarajeshwarinagar CMC. It is named after a famous lake in the vicinity. The NICE road passes through this area. Institutions like Little Flower Public School & PES University are located here. The lake has been encroached and the land has been used up for construction of houses. There has been no efforts from the government to claim the encroached land

Banashankari 3rd/4th Stage (Kathriguppe)
The commercial area of BSK 3rd/4th Stage. Kathriguppe is famous for being the locality where Sandalwood Stars of Cinema of Karnataka Upendra, Srujan Lokesh and Yash resides, Famous for  Big Bazaar, health & glow, Poorvika mobiles, Sangeeta mobiles, Tanishq Jewels and many more. which was the first in South Bangalore. The development of the Outer Ring Road acted as a catalyst to the development of this village. Now this area has many factory outlets like all brands showrooms including Puma, Adidas, Brand Factory, VIP Stores, Reliance Trends, Pantaloons.

Banashankari 5th Stage (ISRO Layout)
Formed in the late 1990s. It is further divided into 2 blocks.

1st Block: Vikram Sarabhai ISRO Layout (Bikasipura/Vasanthapura)
First block is perhaps a bit smaller comprising few hundred sites but more developed among the two blocks since it adjoins the already developed ISRO Layout, Vasanthapura (Kumaraswamy Layout) localities and closer to ORR, Banashankari Temple/TTMC, Kanakapura road Metro Cash & Carry, Jayanagar, J.P.Nagar, Basavangudi, Padmanabhanagar and first four stages of BSK. It also subsumes areas like Bikasipura, Prashanthinagar, Yelachenahalli, Maruthi HBCS Layout, Vittal Nagar, Devarakere Extension (ISRO Layout).

2nd Block: Subramanyapura/Uttarahalli/Poornaprajna HBCS Layout
Whereas, 2nd block is a bit bigger and adjoins Uttarahalli, Marasandra, Doddakalasandra, Poornaprajna HBCS Layout, Bharat HBCS Layout and Vaddarapalya more towards NICE Ring Road.

Banashankari 6th Stage (Vajarahalli)
Formed in the mid 2000 and still in nascent stage in terms of development, this is the largest of all the BDA developed layouts, so far. It is further divided into 15 blocks. This is a sprawling locality nestling between Kanakapura Road in the East, Dr. Vishnuvardhan Road in the North, NICE Road in the West and South. The famous Thurahalli hill and reserved forest around is in the heart of Banashankari 6th Stage. This is a very scenic, serene layout with lot of greenery and rolling hills around.

Transport
The area is well connected by the Bangalore Metropolitan Transport Corporation. There is also Volvo bus facility to this area. The area has a reconstructed bus stand and a Traffic Transit Management Centre.

References

Neighbourhoods in Bangalore